Oregon Route 237 is an Oregon state highway running from OR 82 in Island City to Interstate 84 and U.S. Route 30 in North Powder. OR 237 is composed of the Cove Highway No. 342 (see Oregon highways and routes) and part of the La Grande-Baker Highway No. 66.

Route description 

OR 237 begins at an intersection with OR 82 in Island City. After the concurrency ends, OR 237 continues south to an intersection with I-84 and US 30 in North Powder, where it ends.

Major intersections

References 
 Oregon Department of Transportation, Descriptions of US and Oregon Routes, https://web.archive.org/web/20051102084300/http://www.oregon.gov/ODOT/HWY/TRAFFIC/TEOS_Publications/PDF/Descriptions_of_US_and_Oregon_Routes.pdf, page 18.
 Oregon Department of Transportation, Cove Highway No. 342, ftp://ftp.odot.state.or.us/tdb/trandata/maps/slchart_pdfs_1980_to_2002/Hwy342_1996.pdf
 Oregon Department of Transportation, La Grande-Baker Highway No. 66, ftp://ftp.odot.state.or.us/tdb/trandata/maps/slchart_pdfs_1980_to_2002/Hwy066_2002.pdf

237
Transportation in Union County, Oregon